The 2006 Chatham Cup was the 79th annual nationwide knockout football competition in New Zealand.

Up to the last 16 of the competition, the cup was run in three regions (northern, central, and southern), with an open draw from the quarter-finals on. In all, 137 teams took part in the competition. Note: Different sources give different numberings for the rounds of the competition. Some record five rounds prior to the quarter-finals; others note a preliminary round followed by four full rounds. The former numbering system isn used in this article.

The 2006 final

The Jack Batty Memorial Cup is awarded to the player adjudged to have made to most positive impact in the Chatham Cup final. The winner of the 2006 Jack Batty Memorial Cup was Western Suburbs FC player Jon Harahap.

Results

Third Round

* Won on penalties by Western (5-4).

Fourth Round

* Won on penalties by Palmerston North Marist (9-7).

Fifth Round

* Won on penalties by Tauranga City United (5-4).

Quarter-finals

Semi-finals

* Won on penalties by Eastern Suburbs (5-3).

Final

* Won on penalties by Western Suburbs (3-0).

References

Rec.Sport.Soccer Statistics Foundation New Zealand 2006 page
Ultimatenzsoccer.com 2006 Chatham Cup page

Chatham Cup
Chatham Cup
Chatham Cup
Chat